USNS Sampan Hitch (T-AGM-18) was a missile range instrumentation ship which earlier operated as the U.S. Air Force Ocean Range Vessel USAFS Sampan Hitch (ORV-1836) on the U.S. Air Force's Eastern Test Range during the late 1950s and early 1960s. Sampan Hitch operated under an Air Force contract with  Pan American Airways Guided Missile Range Division headquartered in Cocoa Beach, Florida.

Sampan Hitch, assigned to the South Atlantic Ocean and the Caribbean area, provided the Air Force with metric data on intercontinental ballistic missiles launched from the Cape Canaveral Air Force Station (CCAFS) in Florida.

Sampan Hitch operated in the intercontinental ballistic missile re-entry area near Ascension Island, and was home-ported out of South Atlantic Fleet Hqtrs, Chagaramus (Port of Spain) Trinidad, BWI.

Acquisition by the Navy
Sampan Hitch was acquired from the U.S. Air Force by the U.S. Navy in 1964.

Operational data

Operational data while on U.S. Navy service during post-1964 period on this vessel is lacking.

Inactivation
Sampan Hitch was struck from the Navy List at an unknown date, and was sold for scrapping 23 April 1973 to Dongkuk Steel Mill Company, Ltd., South Korea. Her subsequent fate is not known.

See also
 Missile Range Instrumentation Ship
 List of ships of the United States Air Force
 Eastern Test Range
 Pan American Airways Guided Missile Range Division
 Missile Test Project

References
 NavSource Online: Service Ship Photo Archive - T-AGM-18 Sampan Hitch

 

Type C1-M ships
Ships built in Superior, Wisconsin
1945 ships
World War II merchant ships of the United States
Type C1-M ships of the United States Air Force
Type C1-M ships of the United States Navy
Cold War auxiliary ships of the United States
Signals intelligence
Missile range instrumentation ships of the United States Navy
Research vessels of the United States Navy